Francis Bernard, 3rd Earl of Bandon (3 January 1810 – 17 February 1877), styled Viscount Bernard between 1830 and 1856, was an Irish peer and politician.

Background and education
Born in Grosvenor Street, London, he was the son of James Bernard, 2nd Earl of Bandon, and Mary Susan Albinia, eldest daughter of Charles Brodrick, Archbishop of Cashel. Bernard was educated at Oriel College, Oxford, where he graduated with a Bachelor of Arts in 1830 and a Master of Arts four years thereafter.

Political career
Bernard entered the British House of Commons in January 1831, sitting for Bandon, the same constituency his father had represented before, until July. He was returned for it again from 1842 until 1856, when he succeeded his father as earl. Two years later, Bernard was elected an Irish Representative Peer. In 1874, he was appointed Lord Lieutenant of Cork, post he held until his death in 1877.

Family
He married Catherine Mary, eldest daughter of Thomas Whitmore, in 1832. They had one son and two daughters. His wife died in December 1873. Bernard survived her by four years and died at Castle Bernard, County Cork, in February 1877, aged 67. He was succeeded in the earldom by his only son James.

References

External links 
 

1810 births
1877 deaths
Politicians from County Cork
Alumni of Oriel College, Oxford
Irish representative peers
Members of the Parliament of the United Kingdom for County Cork constituencies (1801–1922)
UK MPs 1830–1831
UK MPs 1831–1832
UK MPs 1841–1847
UK MPs 1847–1852
UK MPs 1852–1857
Bandon, E3
Earls of Bandon